State Route 286 (SR 286) is a highway in southern Arizona that runs from its junction with State Route 86 west of Tucson to the U.S.-Mexico border at Sasabe. It is largely a north–south route.

Route description
The southern terminus of SR 286 is located at the U.S.-Mexico border at Sasabe. The highway heads north from the border traversing a sparsely populated area and does not pass through any cities or towns aside from minor settlements. It provides access to the Buenos Aires National Wildlife Refuge as well as small settlements in Southern Arizona. Although it has a port of entry into El Sásabe, Sonora, Mexico, only dirt roads lead south of this location. The highway generally follows a north-northeast heading for the majority of its route. The northern terminus of the highway is located on SR 86 west of Tucson.

History 
An unpaved road connecting Sasabe to Tucson was built by 1935. The route received a designation as SR 286 in the 1950s. By 1963, a section of the route from SR 86 at the northern terminus to Palo Alto Ranch was paved.

Junction list

See also

References

External links

 Arizona Roads

286
Transportation in Pima County, Arizona